Daniel Vendrys Powell (born 12 March 1991) is an English professional footballer who plays as a winger or a striker for  club Barnet.

Powell started his career with Milton Keynes Dons, and made his first-team debut aged 17 in 2008. He had loan spells with Crawley Town, Forest Green Rovers and Darlington. In both 2010–11 (during which he scored 10 goals) and 2011–12 (11 goals), he helped Milton Keynes Dons reach the play-offs. Powell was a member of the Milton Keynes Dons team that won promotion to the Championship in 2015. Released by Milton Keynes Dons in 2017, he joined Northampton Town before moving to Crewe Alexandra two years later.

Career

Milton Keynes Dons
Born in Luton, Bedfordshire, Powell joined Milton Keynes Dons academy and made his professional debut for the club in a 3–1 victory over Hartlepool United on 15 November 2008, coming on as a substitute in the 84th minute and scoring the team's final goal in the 90th minute.

Crawley Town (loan)
Powell joined Conference Premier club Crawley Town on loan on 3 August 2009, making three league appearances before returning to Milton Keynes Dons.

Forest Green (loan)
Powell was loaned out once more, this time to Conference Premier club Forest Green Rovers. He made his debut for the club on 17 October 2009 in a 5–2 defeat away to Histon. His first goal for the club was the third in a 3–1 win over Salisbury City on Boxing Day 2009. Powell became a regular with Forest Green and the club decided to extend his loan until the end of 2009–10 in January 2010. He completed the loan spell with 29 appearances and six goals.

Darlington (loan)
Having not made an appearance for Milton Keynes Dons at the beginning of the 2010–11 season, Powell joined Conference Premier club Darlington on a one-month loan on 1 October 2010. He made his debut for the club the next day in a 1–0 defeat at home to Wrexham. Three days later, Powell scored his first goal for the club in a 2–1 defeat away to Rushden & Diamonds. He made a further three league appearances during his loan spell.

Return to Milton Keynes Dons

Powell returned to Milton Keynes Dons in November 2010 and began to break into the first team, becoming a regular in the starting lineup after the sales of Aaron Wilbraham to Norwich City and Jermaine Easter to Crystal Palace left the club with just two senior strikers. Powell went on to score nine goals in 29 league appearances for the club in the 2010–11 season. On 5 March 2013, Powell signed a two-year extension to his current Milton Keynes Dons deal, keeping him at the club until June 2015. Powell netted eight times in 42 league appearances in 2014–15, as Milton Keynes Dons were promoted to the Championship as League One runners-up.

On 18 July 2015, Powell signed another two-year extension tying him to the club through June 2017. Milton Keynes Dons were relegated back to League One after only one season, with Powell making 22 league appearances, scoring twice in 2015–16.

On 2 May 2017, Powell was one of three players released by Milton Keynes Dons when his contract expired at the end of 2016–17. Having graduated from the club's academy, Powell made 271 appearances and scored 46 goals for the club across nine seasons.

Northampton Town
On 5 May 2017, Powell signed a two-year contract with League One rivals Northampton Town, and would join the club on 1 July following the expiration of his Milton Keynes Dons contract.

Crewe Alexandra

Powell signed for League Two club Crewe Alexandra on 7 June 2019 on a two-year contract, with the option of a further year. He scored his first goal for Crewe in a 4–2 away win over Carlisle United on 12 October. He scored nine goals in 33 appearances in his first season at promotion-winning Crewe, but started just 12 League One games the following season. On 13 May 2021, Crewe announced that Powell was being released by the club.

Barnet
Following his release from Crewe, Powell joined National League side Barnet on a two-year deal.  Powell scored the winner agsinst Plymouth Parkway in the third round of the FA Trophy.

Style of play
Powell has been described as being a forward thinking player who often runs at full-backs and is a strong asset down the flanks. His unpredictable nature is often an asset and at times a flaw in his character but remains an important player when on the field.

Career statistics

Honours
Milton Keynes Dons
Football League One runner-up: 2014–15

Individual
Milton Keynes Dons Young Player of the Year: 2010–11

References

External links

1991 births
Living people
Footballers from Luton
English footballers
Association football forwards
Milton Keynes Dons F.C. players
Crawley Town F.C. players
Forest Green Rovers F.C. players
Darlington F.C. players
Northampton Town F.C. players
Crewe Alexandra F.C. players
Barnet F.C. players
English Football League players
National League (English football) players